The Samuel Curtis Johnson Graduate School of Management is the graduate business school at Cornell University.

Johnson School may also refer to:

Johnson School (Millsboro, Delaware)
Johnson School (Davenport, Iowa)
Johnson School (North Adams, Massachusetts)